This is a list of television broadcasters which provide coverage of the European League of Football, a professional American football league in ten countries in Europe.

Current

Service 
The service of the gamepass is provided by British company StreamAMG.

References 

Lists of sporting event broadcasters
European League of Football